Vernon De Marco Morlacchi (born 18 November 1992) is a professional footballer who plays as a defender for Slovan Bratislava and the Slovakia national team.

Club career
Born in Rosario, Vernon finished his formation with CD San Francisco. On 14 July 2011, he moved to Constància, and made his senior debuts with the club during the campaign, in Tercera División.

On 22 July 2012, Vernon moved abroad, joining Slovak 2. Liga club Zemplín Michalovce. A regular starter for the club, he contributed with seven goals in 24 appearances during the 2014–15 season, as his side achieved promotion to Fortuna Liga.

Vernon made his professional debut on 18 July 2015, coming on as a second-half substitute for Jozef-Šimon Turík in a 0–1 home loss against AS Trenčín. He scored his first goal in the category on 1 August, netting his team's first in a 2–6 away loss against ŽP Šport Podbrezová.

On 17 June 2017, he was loaned to Ekstraklasa side Lech Poznań. His loan from Slovan Bratislava finished at the end of 2018–19 season.

International career
While fans have discussed his nomination for UEFA Euro 2020, De Marco was first called up to the senior national team by Štefan Tarkovič for three 2022 World Cup qualifiers against Slovenia, Croatia and Cyprus in September 2021. He debuted with Slovakia in a 6–0 2022 World Cup qualification win over Malta coming on as a sub in the 70th minute, and scored on his debut in the 72nd minute.

International goals
As of match played on 20 November 2022. Scores and results list Slovakia's goal tally first.

Personal life
Born an Argentine citizen, De Marco received Slovak citizenship in late May 2021, following an application earlier that year, making him eligible to represent Slovakia internationally. De Marco is a multilingiust speaking fluently in native Spanish as well as Slovak, English, German, Polish and Portuguese.

Career statistics

Club

Honours
Zemplín Michalovce
 2. Liga (1): 2014–15

Slovan Bratislava
Fortuna Liga (3): 2019–20, 2020–21, 2021–22
Slovnaft Cup (3): 2016–17, 2019–20, 2020–21

References

External links
Zemplín Michalovce official profile 
Futbalnet profile 

1992 births
Living people
Footballers from Rosario, Santa Fe
Slovak footballers
Slovakia international footballers
Argentine footballers
Argentine expatriate footballers
Naturalized citizens of Slovakia
Association football defenders
CE Constància players
Lech Poznań players
MFK Zemplín Michalovce players
ŠK Slovan Bratislava players
Tercera División players
Slovak Super Liga players
2. Liga (Slovakia) players
Ekstraklasa players
Expatriate footballers in Spain
Expatriate footballers in Slovakia
Expatriate footballers in Poland
Argentine expatriate sportspeople in Spain
Argentine expatriate sportspeople in Slovakia
Argentine expatriate sportspeople in Poland
Slovak expatriate sportspeople in Spain
Slovak expatriate sportspeople in Poland
Naturalised association football players